The Castle of Oblivion (Middle Persian: anōšbord), also known as the Prison of Oblivion or the Fortress of Oblivion, was a castle and political prison of the Sasanian Empire located in Khuzestan in southwestern Iran.

Notable prisoners of the Castle of Oblivion
 Arshak II, Arsacid prince, who ruled Armenia as a Roman client from 350 until 367. Captured and imprisoned during Shapur II's invasion of Armenia.
 Kavad I, Sasanian king, briefly imprisoned after being deposed by the nobility and clergy in 496.

References

Sources 
 
 

Prisons in Iran
Sasanian castles
Lost buildings and structures
Fortifications in Iran
Khuzestan Province
Defunct prisons
Buildings and structures in Khuzestan Province
History of Khuzestan Province
Former castles in Iran